Consort Zhou may refer to:

Consort Zhou (Cheng) (died 363), concubine of Emperor Cheng of Jin
Empress Zhou (Former Shu) (died 918), wife of Wang Jian (Emperor Gaozu)
Queen Zhou the Elder (936–964), first wife of Li Yu (ruler of Southern Tang)
Empress Zhou (Ming dynasty) (1611–1644), wife of the Chongzhen Emperor